Richard Barry Krauss (born March 17, 1957) is a former professional American football player who played linebacker for twelve seasons in the National Football League (NFL).

Early years
Krauss was born and reared in Pompano Beach, Florida; he was a star football player at Pompano Beach High School from 1972–1975. Voted as Sun Sentinel's "All-Time Broward County Linebacker", Voted to the State of Florida's "Top 100 Football All-Star Team", Most Valuable Player of the MENAC Bowl: 1975. Voted as Sun Sentinel's Player of the Year: 1975.

College career
Highly recruited out of high school, he played college football at the University of Alabama for the legendary coach Paul "Bear" Bryant, and was a key member of Alabama's 1978 National Championship football team. At the 1979 Sugar Bowl in one of the most famous plays in college football history, Krauss stopped Penn State running back Mike Guman short of the goal line late in the 4th quarter to help the Crimson Tide to the National Championship. Krauss was selected MVP of the game for his efforts.

Alabama's All-Century Team: 1970's, Atlanta Touchdown Club's Southeastern Conference Lineman of the Year: 1976, All-American 1977–78, All-SEC 1977–78, Liberty Bowl Most Valuable Player and Defensive Player: 1976, Sugar Bowl Most Valuable Player: 1979 (only defensive player to win MVP in first 75 years of Sugar Bowl History), Defensive Player of the Week Honor: CBS Broadcast of NCAA/Chevrolet Scholarship Program – LSU vs Alabama: 1978, Birmingham Monday Morning QB Club's Defensive Player of the Year: 1978, Inducted into the Alabama Sports Hall of Fame: 2007.

Professional career
Krauss was the first round draft choice (6th overall pick) in 1979 for the Baltimore Colts.  He played ten years in the NFL with the Colts, and played his final two seasons with the Miami Dolphins.  In 12 seasons, he played in 152 games, amassed over 1,000 tackles and had 8 sacks and 6 interceptions.

After football
Today he is a professional broadcaster and motivational speaker based in Carmel, Indiana. In 2007, he was inducted into the Alabama Sports Hall of Fame. In 2013, he began broadcasting Indianapolis Colts preseason with Don Fischer. Krauss is also an honorary member of Theta Chi fraternity.

References

American football linebackers
Alabama Crimson Tide football players
Alabama Crimson Tide football announcers
Indianapolis Colts announcers
Baltimore Colts players
Indianapolis Colts players
Miami Dolphins players
American motivational speakers
1957 births
Living people
People from Pompano Beach, Florida
People from Carmel, Indiana
Krauss, Barry
National Football League announcers
College football announcers
Sportspeople from Broward County, Florida
Ed Block Courage Award recipients